Daniel Pilon (November 13, 1940 – June 26, 2018) was a Canadian actor, known for his role on Dallas as Renaldo "Naldo" Marchetta.

Pilon was born in Montreal, Quebec.  In addition to Dallas, he has appeared in daytime soap operas such as Ryan's Hope, Guiding Light and Days of Our Lives.

Personal life
Pilon was born in Montreal, Quebec. He was the brother of actor Donald Pilon.

After his house was destroyed by the 1994 Northridge earthquake in January 1994, he declared his first bankruptcy in April 1994. That same year, he divorced his wife.

Career
He made his film debut in Le Viol d'une jeune fille douce, directed by Canadian director Gilles Carle.

He was considered for the role of James Bond twice, in 1968 and in 1984.

Filmography

References

External links

1940 births
2018 deaths
Canadian male film actors
Canadian male soap opera actors
Canadian male television actors
French Quebecers
Male actors from Montreal
20th-century Canadian male actors
21st-century Canadian male actors